Sarah Reed (born 12 May 1980) is a former England women's international footballer. Her greatest achievement was playing in the winning games of the 1998 FA Women's Cup Final and 1999 FA Women's Cup Final with Arsenal.

Club career
Reed was an unused substitute for Wembley when they won the 1995–96 FA Women's Premier League Cup final, beating Doncaster Belles on penalties at Underhill Stadium.

International career
Reed won three caps for England, at a time when she was an understudy to Pauline Cope. She was called up for the first time by Ted Copeland as a 16-year-old Wembley player for a UEFA Women's Euro 1997 qualifying fixture against Portugal at Griffin Park on 19 May 1996. She appeared as a substitute for Cope in a 6–0 friendly defeat by the United States in Portland, Oregon, on 11 May 1997. She made another substitute appearance for Cope in a 4–1 1999 FIFA Women's World Cup qualification playoff win in Romania on 13 September 1998. Her third and final England cap came as a substitute for Rachel Brown in a 4–1 friendly defeat by Italy in Bologna on 26 May 1999.

Honours
Arsenal
 FA Women's Cup: 1998, 1999

References

Living people
Arsenal W.F.C. players
English women's footballers
FA Women's National League players
England women's international footballers
Women's association football goalkeepers
Barnet F.C. Ladies players
1980 births